Communauté d'agglomération Chauny Tergnier La Fère is the communauté d'agglomération, an intercommunal structure, centred on the towns of Chauny, Tergnier and La Fère. It is located in the Aisne department, in the Hauts-de-France region, northern France. Created in 2017, its seat is in Chauny. Its area is 382.8 km2. Its population was 55,189 in 2019.

Composition
The communauté d'agglomération consists of the following 48 communes:

Abbécourt
Achery
Amigny-Rouy
Andelain
Anguilcourt-le-Sart
Autreville
Beaumont-en-Beine
Beautor
Bertaucourt-Epourdon
Béthancourt-en-Vaux
Bichancourt
Brie
Caillouël-Crépigny
Caumont
Charmes
Chauny
Commenchon
Condren
Courbes
Danizy
Deuillet
La Fère
Fourdrain
Fressancourt
Frières-Faillouël
Guivry
Liez
Manicamp
Marest-Dampcourt
Mayot
Mennessis
Monceau-lès-Leups
Neuflieux
La Neuville-en-Beine
Ognes
Pierremande
Quierzy
Rogécourt
Saint-Gobain
Saint-Nicolas-aux-Bois
Servais
Sinceny
Tergnier
Travecy
Ugny-le-Gay
Versigny
Villequier-Aumont
Viry-Noureuil

References

Chauny
Chauny